Frank Livingston Ball (October 4, 1885 – April 28, 1966) was a member of the Virginia Senate from 1924 to 1932.

Early life
Frank Livingston Ball was born in Clarendon, Arlington, Virginia on October 4, 1885 to America A. (née Deeble) and William Ball, a member of the Ball Family that Ballston, Arlington, Virginia is named for. He was educated in public schools and graduated from Western High School in Washington, D.C. He graduated from the National University School of Law with a law degree in 1908.

Career
Ball started practicing law at Fort Myer Heights in Rosslyn, Virginia. In 1915, Ball was elected Commonwealth's Attorney of Arlington County. He served as the Commonwealth's Attorney from 1916 to 1924. During World War I, Ball served as fuel administrator of Arlington County and chairman of the United War Work Campaign. After the war, he was chairman of the first campaign for Near East Relief.

Ball practiced law with Ball & Douglas. He was elected as a member of the Virginia Senate of the 13th Senatorial District, and served from 1924 to 1932. He attended the Constitutional Convention of 1945 and the Constitutional Convention of 1956.

Ball was the author of the County Manager Form of Government. Arlington County adopted the county manager form of government in 1930.

Personal life
Ball married Anna M. Shreve on September 10, 1913. Together, they had four children: Frank Livingston Ball Jr., Elizabeth, Virginia and Barbara.

In 1926, Ball bought and moved into the historic Glebe House in Arlington.

Death

Ball died on April 28, 1966. He is interred at Columbia Gardens Cemetery.

References

External links

1885 births
1966 deaths
People from Arlington County, Virginia
National University School of Law alumni
Virginia state senators
20th-century American politicians
20th-century American lawyers
Virginia lawyers